George Stanford Smith (August 13, 1917 – November 16, 2007) was a Canadian ice hockey player. He played 9 games in the National Hockey League with the New York Rangers during the 1939–40 and 1940–41 seasons. The rest of his career, which lasted from 1936 to 1950, was spent in various minor leagues. He was born in Coal Creek, British Columbia.

Playing career
He made his debut in the 1939–40 season, making him one of the first NHL players from British Columbia. Smith played his first NHL game in the 1940 Stanley Cup Finals with the New York Rangers, helping them win the Stanley Cup. He qualified to be included on the Cup, but his name was left off by mistake, though the NHL still credits Smith as winning it. The next year he played in eight games regular season games recording three points. He continued playing until 1950 in different minor leagues.

Later life
Stan Smith died in 2007 in Fernie, BC, where he had resided in retirement.

Career statistics

Regular season and playoffs

References

External links
 

1917 births
2007 deaths
Canadian expatriate ice hockey players in the United States
Canadian ice hockey centres
Cleveland Barons (1937–1973) players
Ice hockey people from British Columbia
Minneapolis Millers (AHA) players
New York Rangers players
New York Rovers players
Philadelphia Ramblers players
San Francisco Shamrocks (PCHL) players